Fattiga riddare och stora svenskar (lit. Poor Knights and Great Swedes) is the fifth novel by Swedish author Klas Östergren. It was published in 1983.

References

External links

1983 Swedish novels
Novels by Klas Östergren
Swedish-language novels
Novels set in Stockholm
Albert Bonniers Förlag books